Hubert Jude Brown (born September 25, 1933) is an American retired basketball coach and player and a current television analyst.  Brown is a two-time NBA Coach of the Year, the honors being separated by 26 years. Brown was inducted into the Naismith Memorial Basketball Hall of Fame in 2005.

Early life and career
Born in Hazleton, Pennsylvania, Brown moved to Elizabeth, New Jersey at age three and was raised there, living in a small apartment building without a telephone. Brown, an only child, has said that his father, Charlie, who worked at the shipyards, was a "demanding man."

He graduated from St. Mary of the Assumption High School in 1951. While in high school, St. Mary won state championships in football, basketball and baseball.

Hubie Brown played college basketball and baseball at Niagara University, graduating in 1955 with a degree in education. While at Niagara, Brown was a teammate (and roommate) of former Utah Jazz coach Frank Layden, as well as Larry Costello and Charlie Hoxie, who would go on to star for the Harlem Globetrotters.

After leaving Niagara, Brown joined the U.S. Army where he joined the Army's basketball team. After being honorably discharged in 1958, Brown briefly played for the Rochester Colonels of the Eastern Professional Basketball League (the forerunner to the Continental Basketball Association) before they folded after just eight games. He averaged 13.8 points per game in his brief stint as a pro and was an excellent defender as a player.

Brown also returned to Niagara to earn a master's degree in education as he looked to pursue a coaching career.

Brown's defensive mentality would carry on into his coaching career, which began in 1955 at St. Mary Academy in Little Falls, New York where he coached both basketball and baseball. He spent nine years coaching at the high school level, including Cranford High School in Cranford, New Jersey and Fair Lawn High School in Fair Lawn, New Jersey, before becoming an assistant coach for one season at the College of William & Mary in 1968. The following season, Brown joined Duke University as an assistant coach.

Milwaukee Bucks
Brown coached at Duke until 1972, when he joined the NBA as an assistant coach for the Milwaukee Bucks under Larry Costello.  Milwaukee made the NBA Finals in 1974 with future Hall of Famers Kareem Abdul-Jabbar and Oscar Robertson, but fell in seven games to the Boston Celtics, who were led by their own superstars: Dave Cowens, John Havlicek, Jo Jo White and future Bucks coach Don Nelson.

Coaching career

Kentucky Colonels
After two seasons in the NBA, Brown was given his first professional head coaching opportunity with the Kentucky Colonels of the American Basketball Association.  Brown led the Colonels to the 1975 ABA Championship.  Brown continued as the Colonels' coach until the ABA-NBA merger in 1976 when the Colonels franchise folded, one of two ABA teams that did not join the NBA (the Spirits of St. Louis being the other).

Atlanta Hawks
Brown then rejoined the NBA as head coach of the Atlanta Hawks, going 31–51 in his first season with the Hawks.  But by the 1977–78 season, the Hawks had rebounded into a .500 team, finishing 41–41 and earning Coach of the Year honors for Brown. Two years later, in 1979–80, they won only their second division title since moving to Atlanta. However, after they tumbled to a 31-win season in 1980–81, Brown was fired with just three games remaining in the season.

New York Knicks
Brown joined the New York Knicks in 1982, succeeding long-time coach Red Holzman. He stayed with the Knicks until he was fired in 1986 after starting the season 4–12. After reaching the playoffs in each of Brown's first two seasons, the Knicks plummeted to 24–58 in 1984–85 and 23–59 in 1985–86. But there were circumstances that were far beyond Brown's control that hastened the downfall. Star forward Bernard King suffered a devastating knee injury in March 1985 in a game against the Kansas City Kings, not fully recovering for two seasons, while Patrick Ewing, the top overall pick in the 1985 NBA Draft, missed 32 games in an injury-plagued rookie season. Brown left the Knicks at the beginning of the 1986–87 season, succeeded by Bob Hill.

Memphis Grizzlies
Sixteen years removed from his previous NBA coaching job, Brown was again tapped to be a head coach in the NBA 2002–03 season by Jerry West of the Memphis Grizzlies, who fired coach Sidney Lowe after an 0–8 start. The Grizzlies' choice of Brown was quite controversial at the time; Hubie Brown was the oldest coach in the NBA at the age of 69.

Brown finished the season with a 28–46 record with the team, at the time the team's record for wins. However, the team underwent a complete turnaround for the 2003–04 season, finishing 50–32 and making the playoffs for the first time in team history. Brown was again named the NBA's Coach of the Year.

However, by the 2004–05 season, there were again concerns about Brown's health and age. Brown was given medical clearance to start the season, but was forced to delegate much work to his assistant coaches, including his son, Brendan Brown. This led to an incident between Brendan Brown and Jason Williams when Williams snapped at Brown during the fourth quarter of a game early on in the season. Williams eventually apologized, but the Grizzlies were beginning to struggle during the season, starting 5–7.

Brown then unexpectedly resigned from the Grizzlies on Thanksgiving Day, November 25, 2004. In a statement, he cited "unexpected health-related issues... [that were] absolutely nonexistent at the beginning of the season." Details of the specific "health-related issues" were not announced. Shortly afterward Mike Fratello was announced as the new Grizzlies coach, marking the second time in his career that he had succeeded Brown at an NBA head coaching position.

Soon after Brown's unexpected departure, it was reported by Ronald Tillery of the Memphis The Commercial Appeal that a combination of negative attitudes among James Posey, Jason Williams, and Bonzi Wells led to his leaving. Brown coached his team with a 10-man rotation, which meant that players got smaller amounts of playing time.

Broadcasting career
Brown began broadcasting after being fired by the Hawks, working for USA Network's coverage of the NBA, including playoff games as well as CBS before being hired by the Knicks. During the 1985 NBA playoffs, Brown lent his services for CBS once again while still coaching the Knicks, who were not in the playoffs, teaming up with Brent Musburger. Following his dismissal from the Knicks, CBS hired Brown full-time as a broadcaster in December 1986, and served alongside Verne Lundquist as the third team during select regular season and playoff games, promoted to the second team the next season. When asked in 1988 how long he will remain involved with the game of basketball, Brown responded "I will stay involved in some capacity until the day Verne Lundquist dies." In 1988, CBS named Brown to replace Billy Cunningham as its lead analyst alongside play-by-play man Dick Stockton. Brown remained with CBS until the end of their NBA coverage following the 1990 NBA Finals, then worked on the local broadcasts for the Philadelphia 76ers and the Detroit Pistons before joining TNT in the early 1990s. Brown continued anchoring TNT's basketball coverage through the 2001–02 season, in which he was paired with various announcers such as Bob Neal, Ron Thulin, Pete Van Wieren, and his old CBS partners Verne Lundquist and Dick Stockton.

Shortly after his departure from the Grizzlies, Brown signed with ABC as their top NBA analyst. Brown worked with Al Michaels and Mike Breen on some regular-season and playoff games, including the 2005 NBA Finals and 2006 NBA Finals, before he was replaced as lead analyst by Mark Jackson and Jeff Van Gundy. Brown currently calls games on ABC and ESPN working alongside such play-by-play announcers as Mark Jones and Mike Breen. He also contributes to ESPN Radio's coverage of the NBA playoffs and NBA Finals.

Brown was nominated for a Sports Emmy in 1994 and 1999.

Halls of Fame
 Naismith Memorial Basketball Hall of Fame (class of 2005 as a contributor).
 National Sports Media Association Hall of Fame (class of 2022 as a broadcaster)

Personal life

Brown and his wife Claire have three daughters (Molly, Virginia, and Julie) and a son (Brendan), a former NBA scout and assistant coach who has worked for the New York Knicks as a radio analyst. Brown also has four grandchildren.

Head coaching record

ABA and NBA

|-
| align="left" |Kentucky
| align="left" |
|84||58||26||.690|| align="center" |1st in Eastern||15||12||3||.800
| align="center" |Won ABA Finals
|-
| align="left" |Kentucky
| align="left" |
|84||46||38||.548|| align="center" |4th in ABA||10||5||5||.500
| align="center" |Lost in Semifinals
|-
| align="left" |Atlanta
| align="left" |
|82||31||51||.378|| align="center" |6th in Central||—||—||—||—
| align="center" |Missed Playoffs
|-
| align="left" |Atlanta
| align="left" |
|82||41||41||.500|| align="center" |4th in Central||2||0||2||.000
| align="center" |Lost in First Round
|-
| align="left" |Atlanta
| align="left" |
|82||46||36||.561|| align="center" |3rd in Central||9||5||4||.556
| align="center" |Lost in Conf. Semifinals
|-
| align="left" |Atlanta
| align="left" |
|82||50||32||.610|| align="center" |1st in Central||5||1||4||.200
| align="center" |Lost in Conf. Semifinals
|-
| align="left" |Atlanta
| align="left" |
|79||31||48||.392|| align="center" |(fired)||—||—||—||—
| align="center" |—
|-
| align="left" |New York
| align="left" |
|82||44||38||.537|| align="center" |4th in Atlantic||6||2||4||.333
| align="center" |Lost in Conf. Semifinals
|-
| align="left" |New York
| align="left" |
|82||47||35||.573|| align="center" |3rd in Atlantic||12||6||6||.500
| align="center" |Lost in Conf. Semifinals
|-
| align="left" |New York
| align="left" |
|82||24||58||.293|| align="center" |5th in Atlantic||—||—||—||—
| align="center" |Missed Playoffs
|-
| align="left" |New York
| align="left" |
|82||23||59||.280|| align="center" |5th in Atlantic||—||—||—||—
| align="center" |Missed Playoffs
|-
| align="left" |New York
| align="left" |
|16||4||12||.250|| align="center" |(fired)||—||—||—||—
| align="center" |—
|-
| align="left" |Memphis
| align="left" |
|74||28||46||.378|| align="center" |6th in Midwest||—||—||—||—
| align="center" |Missed Playoffs
|-
| align="left" |Memphis
| align="left" |
|82||50||32||.610|| align="center" |4th in Midwest||4||0||4||.000
| align="center" |Lost in First Round
|-
| align="left" |Memphis
| align="left" |
|12||5||7||.417|| align="center" |(resigned)||—||—||—||—
| align="center" |—
|-class="sortbottom"
| align="left" |Career
| ||1087||528||559||.486|| ||63||31||32||.492

References

External links
 
 Basketball-Reference.com: Coaching Record – Hubie Brown
NBA Coaches of the Month

1933 births
Living people
American men's basketball coaches
American men's basketball players
Atlanta Hawks head coaches
Basketball coaches from New Jersey
Basketball coaches from Pennsylvania
Basketball players from New Jersey
Basketball players from Pennsylvania
College basketball announcers in the United States
Duke Blue Devils men's basketball coaches
ESPN people
High school baseball coaches in the United States
High school basketball coaches in New Jersey
High school basketball coaches in New York (state)
Kentucky Colonels coaches
Memphis Grizzlies head coaches
Military personnel from Pennsylvania
Milwaukee Bucks assistant coaches
Naismith Memorial Basketball Hall of Fame inductees
New York Knicks head coaches
National Basketball Association broadcasters
Niagara Purple Eagles baseball players
Niagara Purple Eagles men's basketball players
People from Hazleton, Pennsylvania
Sportspeople from Elizabeth, New Jersey
William & Mary Tribe men's basketball coaches